"After You, Who?" is a popular song written by Cole Porter for his 1932 musical Gay Divorce, where it was introduced by Fred Astaire. Astaire played the character Guy, and opened the musical with "After You, Who?"

Astaire reprised the song later in Act 1, before the introduction of "Night and Day".  
The original rhythm was a fox trot, and early recordings generally use that rhythm.  Later recordings span the full range of jazz types.

Notable recordings
Ella Fitzgerald - Dream Dancing (1978)
Lena Horne - Lena Horne at the Waldorf Astoria (1957) - as part of a Cole Porter Medley
Jeri Southern - Jeri Southern Meets Cole Porter (1959)
Jody Watley - Red Hot + Blue (1990)

References

1932 songs
Songs written by Cole Porter
Songs from Gay Divorce
Lena Horne songs
Fred Astaire songs